Metanonychus is a genus of harvestman in the family Paranonychidae. There are at least three described species in Metanonychus, found in the northwestern United States.

Species
These three species belong to the genus Metanonychus:
 Metanonychus idahoensis Briggs, 1971
 Metanonychus nigricans Briggs, 1971
 Metanonychus setulus Briggs, 1971

References

Further reading

 
 
 

Harvestmen